Huntington Independent School District is a public school district based in Huntington, Texas (USA).

In 2009, the school district was rated "recognized" by the Texas Education Agency.

Schools
In the 2012-2013 school year, the district had students in five schools. 
High schools
Huntington High School (Grades 9-12)
Middle schools
Huntington Middle School (Grades 6-8)
Elementary schools
Huntington Intermediate (Grades 4-5)
Huntington Elementary (Grades EE-3)
Alternative schools
Huntington PRIDE Alternative School (Grades 9-12)

Athletics 
Football

The Huntington Red Devil football team first kicked off in 1982 with Jack Churchill as the first coach of many for the team. They have never won district, had a winning season, and only 3 playoff appearances (the first one not coming until 2018).

References

External links

School districts in Angelina County, Texas